Ousseni Diop (born 20 December 1970) is a Burkinabé footballer. He played in eleven matches for the Burkina Faso national football team from 1992 to 1996. He was also named in Burkina Faso's squad for the 1996 African Cup of Nations tournament.

References

External links
 

1970 births
Living people
Burkinabé footballers
Burkina Faso international footballers
1996 African Cup of Nations players
Place of birth missing (living people)
Association football defenders
21st-century Burkinabé people
ASFA Yennenga players